(formerly Aster lanceolatus and Aster simplex) is a species of flowering plant in the family Asteraceae native to North America. The lance-shaped leaves are generally hairless but may feel slightly rough to the touch on the top because of tiny bristles. The flowers grow in clusters and branch in panicles. The flower centers consist of disk florets that begin as yellow and become purple as they mature.

The species occurs in a wide variety of mostly moist and open habitats, including riparian areas (areas between land and a river or stream), meadows, and ditches. Panicled aster has a stout rhizome and can spread to form a clonal colony as well as reproduce by wind-blown seed. Because of its rhizomatic spreading and its production of chemicals that can be detrimental to other plants around it, the species can do damage to ecosystems outside of its native range, as it has in Europe where it has been introduced.

Symphyotrichum lanceolatum is currently divided into subspecies and varieties which have minor differences in appearance and vary in chromosome counts as well as distribution, with some overlap. It is a conservationally secure species whose late-summer and fall appearing flowers play an important role for late-season pollinators and nectar-seeking insects such as bumblebees, wasps, and hoverflies. In addition to being used by indigenous peoples of the Americas for medicinal purposes, it has been cultivated as an ornamental garden plant and used in the cut flower industry.

Description

The leaves are generally hairless but may feel slightly rough to the touch on the top because of tiny bristles. The leaf blades have winged petioles and may sheath the stem at their bases. Those higher on the stem are smaller, and the lower leaves may have toothed edges.

The inflorescence is usually a large, branching panicled array of many flower heads of varying size. Each flower head has many tiny florets put together into what appear as one. The roughly 20–40 disk florets bloom yellow and turn purple. Each has five lobes that may spread when open.

Chromosomes
Symphyotrichum lanceolatum has a base number of  Tetraploid, pentaploid, hexaploid, septaploid, and octaploid cytotypes with respective chromosome counts of 32, 40, 48, 56, and 64 have been reported, depending on the infraspecies, as follows:

 S. lanceolatum var. hesperium: 2n = 8x = 64.
 S. lanceolatum var. hirsuticaule: 2n = 4x = 32.
 S. lanceolatum var. interior: 2n = 6x = 48 and 2n = 8x = 64.
 S. lanceolatum var. lanceolatum: 2n = 4x = 32, 2n = 5x = 40, 2n = 6x = 48, 2n = 7x = 56, and 2n = 8x = 64.
 S. lanceolatum var. latifolium: 2n = 8x = 64.

Taxonomy

Symphyotrichum lanceolatum was formerly included in the large genus Aster as Aster lanceolatus. However, this broad circumscription of Aster is polyphyletic and the North American asters are now mostly classified in Symphyotrichum and several other genera. It is classified in the subgenus Symphyotrichum, section Symphyotrichum, subsection Dumosi, one of the "bushy asters and relatives".

Infraspecies
This species may be divided into two subspecies and five varieties, shown here. NatureServe follows this circumscription.
 S. lanceolatum subsp. hesperium
 S. lanceolatum var. hesperium
 S. lanceolatum subsp. lanceolatum
 S. lanceolatum var. hirsuticaule
 S. lanceolatum var. interior
 S. lanceolatum var. lanceolatum
 S. lanceolatum var. latifolium

In the case of the subspecies autonyms, sometimes one or the other will be ignored or treated as taxonomic synonyms, as in the case of Plants of the World Online (POWO), for example, shown here:
 S. lanceolatum subsp. lanceolatum
 S. lanceolatum var. hesperium
 S. lanceolatum var. hirsuticaule
 S. lanceolatum var. interior
 S. lanceolatum var. latifolium

Hybrids

The hybrid of  lanceolatum with  novi-begii, known as  salignum, originated in cultivation and is now naturalized in Europe.

Etymology
Symphyotrichum lanceolatum is commonly known as panicled aster, white panicled aster, and lance-leaved aster. Other common names include tall white aster, eastern line aster, lance-leaf aster, and white-panicle aster.

Along with other asters that bloom in the fall, Symphyotrichum lanceolatum may be called a Michaelmas daisy. Narrow-leaf Michaelmas daisy is also one of its common names. S. lanceolatum var. interior may be called interior white aster, and S. lanceolatum var. latifolium may be called broadleaf panicled aster. S. lanceolatum var. hesperium common names include western line aster, western willow aster, Wooten's aster, and Siskiyou aster. Another species in the family Asteraceae, Eucephalus glabratus, is also commonly known as Siskiyou aster.

Aster comes from the Ancient Greek word  (astḗr), meaning "star," referring to the shape of the flower. The word "aster" was used to describe a star-like flower as early as 1542 in German physician and botanist Leonhart Fuchs' book , Latin for Notable Commentaries on the History of Plants. An old common name for Astereae species using the suffix "-wort" is starwort, also spelled star-wort or star wort.

The specific epithet (second part of the binomial name) lanceolatum is a Latin adjective meaning "lance-shaped." The genus name Symphyotrichum is a combining of Ancient Greek words meaning "junction of hair."

Distribution and habitat

Native
Symphyotrichum lanceolatum is native to much of Canada, the United States, and northwestern Mexico. In its native range, it occurs in a wide variety of mostly moist and open habitats, including riparian areas, meadows, and ditches. Distribution and habitat vary among the infraspecies. 

 is widespread in central and northeastern North America. It is absent in the west and southeast.

 is a widespread western species native to North America in the Northwest Territories, from British Columbia to Quebec; nearly all the contiguous United States west of the Mississippi River, plus Wisconsin; as well as the Mexican states of Baja California, Sonora and Chihuahua.

It is the only variety native to the southeastern United States.

Introduced
Symphyotrichum lanceolatum has been introduced and naturalized in many parts of Europe, from Belgium to Serbia to Latvia, where it occurs in disturbed man-made habitats and riparian areas as an invasive species. , it was not on the European Union's List of invasive alien species of Union concern.

Ecology

In its native range, Symphyotrichum lanceolatum may be a minor weed in agricultural fields. In addition to dispersal by wind-blown seed, it spreads extensively by rhizomes to create large clonal colonies. Although these clones do not dominate habitats in North America, growing in association with grasses, goldenrods, and other asters, in Europe it is an invasive species that excludes native plants in riparian habitats. This invasiveness has been linked to allelopathic compounds in  tissue and their effects on native European plants. Viable seed production in Europe seems to be limited, and the species largely spreads there via rhizomes.

The species is visited by a wide variety of late-season pollinating and nectar-seeking insects, including bees, hoverflies, flies, moths, and wasps. Cross-fertilization is usually required to produce viable seed, and as such, large clones may have low seed production.

Pests and diseases
Several midge species are known to form galls on Symphyotrichum lanceolatum where their larvae can develop, including Rhopalomyia asteriflorae in the flowers or buds resulting in their stunted growth, and Rhopalomyia strobiligemma. 

The leaf-blister gall midge Asteromyia paniculata and the fungus Schlerotium asteris have a symbiotic relationship on the leaves in that the fungus gains additional nutrition from the larva and, in turn, gives some shelter to the midge.

Leaf-mining insects known to feed on this species include Sumitrosis inaequalis, Ophiomyia curvipalpis, Phytomyza albiceps, and Microrhopala xerene.

Conservation
NatureServe lists the species Symphyotrichum lanceolatum as a whole as Secure (G5) worldwide; Vulnerable (S3) in Iowa; and, Imperiled (S2) in North Carolina and Newfoundland.  hesperium,  lanceolatum,  interior, and  latifolium are all listed as a Secure Subspecies (T5) globally. NatureServe has no global ranking for  hirsuticaule.

In individual states and provinces of the United States and Canada,  hesperium is Vulnerable (S3) in Wyoming, and Critically Imperiled (S1) in Texas;  interior is Possibly Extirpated (SH) in New York state and Quebec, and Critically Imperiled (S1) in New Jersey; and,  latifolium is Vulnerable (S3) in Ontario and Georgia.  hirsuticaule has no vulnerable or critical state or province rankings.

Uses

Medicinal
Within its native range, Symphyotrichum lanceolatum has been used by indigenous peoples for a variety of medicinal purposes:  hesperium by the Zuni people in the American Southwest for wounds and nosebleed, and  lanceolatum by the Iroquois in what is now eastern Canada to treat fever.

Gardening
Symphyotrichum lanceolatum has been cultivated as an ornamental garden plant and used in the cut flower industry. , it was listed in the Royal Horticultural Society Plant Finder with availability at 3–4 nurseries.

Citations

References

Further reading

lanceolatum
Flora of Canada
Flora of the United States
Flora of Mexico
Plants used in traditional Native American medicine
Plants described in 1803
Taxa named by Carl Ludwig Willdenow